Ľubomír Machyniak (born 7 February 1971) is a Slovak biathlete. He competed in the men's 20 km individual event at the 1998 Winter Olympics.

References

1971 births
Living people
Slovak male biathletes
Olympic biathletes of Slovakia
Biathletes at the 1998 Winter Olympics
Sportspeople from Brezno